Polkan or Palkan (Russian: Полка́н or Палкан, from the Italian Pulicane) is a half-human, half-horse (in some variants, half-dog) creature from Russian folktales which possesses enormous power and speed. In folk etymology his name is understood as полуконь (polukon - half-horse). He appears first as the enemy of the hero  Bova Korolevich, but after a battle becomes his loyal friend and ally. 

Polkan is originally based on Pulicane, a half-dog character from Andrea da Barberino's poem "I Reali di Francia", which was once popular in the Slavonic world in prosaic translations.

In the 19th century Polkan became a popular name for a guard dog.

See also
Bova Korolevich
Centaur 

Russian folklore characters
Horses in mythology
Slavic legendary creatures